The following is the list of chancellors of Transylvania during the Principality of Transylvania.

List of chancellors

Principality of Transylvania

Habsburg rule
The Transylvanian Court Chancellery was established in 1694, according to the Diploma Leopoldinum, modeled on its Hungarian counterpart. Leopold I also created the Gubernium ("Governorate") which was the main governmental body of Transylvania until the Austro-Hungarian Compromise of 1867.

During the reign of Joseph II the Hungarian and Transylvanian Court Chancelleries were merged in 1787. The King withdrew his, among others, regulation on his deathbed.

See also
 Governor of Transylvania
 List of rulers of Transylvania
 Principality of Transylvania (1570–1711)
 Voivode of Transylvania

References
 Markó, László: A magyar állam főméltóságai Szent Istvántól napjainkig – Életrajzi Lexikon p. 113.  (The High Officers of the Hungarian State from Saint Stephen to the Present Days – A Biographical Encyclopedia) (2nd edition); Helikon Kiadó Kft., 2006, Budapest; .
 Trócsányi, Zsolt: Erdély központi kormányzata 1540–1690. Budapest: Akadémiai. 1980. . pp. 181–183.

 
Transylvanian chancellors
Transylvanian chancellors